An hexathlon is a combined event competition consisting of six different sports or contests.

The six different sports of the Hexathlon are: 75m Hurdles, Long Jump, Javelin, High Jump, Shot Put and the 800 Metres.

Track and field
An hexathlon in athletics is an event which consists of six track and field events. The word "hexathlon" derives from the Greek words hexa, the number 6, and athlos, meaning contest. A hexathlon is not often organized, mostly at youth levels. It was on the program of the Central American and Caribbean Age Group Championships in Athletics until 2007, South American Youth Championships in Athletics until 1998 and the South American Junior Championships in Athletics until 1974.

The word hexathlon is also used for other forms of combined contests, like bridge, gaming, workouts, etc..

References 
Brian Mac Sports Coach

Combined track and field events
Multisports